London Airport may refer to a number of airports around the world, including several airports serving Greater London, the capital city of the United Kingdom.

United Kingdom

Airports serving London
 London Heathrow Airport, main international airport in Greater London (also known as London Airport from 1946 to 1966)
 London Ashford Airport, in Lydd, Kent
 London Biggin Hill Airport
 London City Airport
 London Gatwick Airport, second busiest international airport in Greater London located in Crawley, West Sussex
 London Luton Airport, in Luton, Bedfordshire
 London Oxford Airport, in Kidlington, Oxfordshire
 London Southend Airport, in Rochford, Essex
 London Stansted Airport, in Uttlesford, Essex
 London Heliport, in Wandsworth

Defunct
 Croydon Airport, known as London-Croydon Airport, formerly London's primary airport
 London Manston Airport, in Kent

There have been further proposals, e.g. London Britannia Airport, and military airfields in and around London.

Elsewhere
 Eday Airport, known locally as London Airport as it is near the Bay of London in Orkney, Scotland

Canada
 London International Airport, in London, Ontario
 London/Chapeskie Field Airport, in London, Ontario

United States
 Groton-New London Airport serving Groton and New London, Connecticut
 London-Corbin Airport, in London, Kentucky
 New London Airport (Virginia) in Forest, Virginia

South Africa
 East London Airport, in East London, Eastern Cape

See also
 Airports of London (United Kingdom)